Laurence Beddome Turner MIEE (28 January 1886–6 April 1963), was a British electrical engineer, Fellow of King's College, Cambridge, and Reader in Engineering at the University of Cambridge.

Biography

Born in Charlton, London on 6 April 1886, Laurence Turner was educated at Bedford School and at King's College, Cambridge as a Foundation Scholar. He worked as an electrical engineer at Siemens Brothers in London, and at Siemens & Halske in Berlin. During the First World War he became a captain at the War Office's Signals Experimental Establishment (SEE) at Woolwich, London, developing wireless telegraphy for the British Army. In 1919 he was elected as a Fellow and Director of Studies in Engineering at King's College, Cambridge. During the Second World War he became part of the team developing radar at the Admiralty Signals Establishment.

Dr Laurence Turner died on 28 January 1963.

Publications

Dr Turner's publications included Wireless Telegraphy and Telephony: An Outline for Electrical Engineers and Others, 1921, and Wireless: a treatise on the theory and practice of high-frequency electric signalling, 1931.

References

1886 births
1963 deaths
People educated at Bedford School
Alumni of King's College, Cambridge
British electrical engineers
English electrical engineers
Fellows of King's College, Cambridge